The 2018–19 Southeast Missouri State Redhawks men's basketball team represented Southeast Missouri State University during the 2018–19 NCAA Division I men's basketball season. The Redhawks, led by fourth-year head coach Rick Ray, played their home games at the Show Me Center in Cape Girardeau, Missouri as members of the  Ohio Valley Conference. They finished the season 10–21 overall, 5–13 in OVC play, finishing in 11th place. Only the top eight teams can play in the OVC tournament, so the Redhawks did not qualify this season.

Previous season
The Redhawks finished the 2017–18 season 14–17, 8–10 in OVC play to finish in seventh place.

The team was ineligible for postseason play this season due to APR violations.

Roster

Schedule and results

|-
!colspan=9 style=| Exhibition

|-
!colspan=9 style=| Non-conference regular season

|-
!colspan=9 style=| Ohio Valley Conference regular season

References

Southeast Missouri State Redhawks men's basketball seasons
Southeast Missouri State
Southeast Missouri State Redhawks men's basketball
Southeast Missouri State Redhawks men's basketball